The Boxing Tournament at the 1954 Asian Games was held in Manila, Philippines between 5 May and 8 May 1954. A total of 37 boxers from 9 nations competed at the competition.

The host nation dominated the competition winning five out of seven gold medals.

Medalists

Medal table

Participating nations
A total of 37 athletes from 9 nations competed in boxing at the 1954 Asian Games:

References
Results

External links
 OCA official website

 
1954 Asian Games events
1954
Asian Games
1954 Asian Games